Burlesque in Harlem (also released as Rock & Roll Burlesque and A French Peep Show) is a 1949 revue film directed by William D. Alexander that features a cast of singers, dancers and comedians who were prominent on the so-called Chitlin' Circuit of vaudeville theaters and nightclubs that exclusively presented African American talent.

The plotless film is hosted by Dick Barrow, who sings "Juice Head Baby", and the main headliner is the comedian Pigmeat Markham, who performs a sketch called The Love Making Bureau.

Other performers in the cast include the dancer Gertrude "Baby" Banks, the singers Jo Jo Adams and Hucklebuck Jones, the striptease contortionist Tarza Young, and the tap dance duo Slip and Slide.

Plot
Barrow, the master of ceremonies, invites the audience to a special "bronze burlesque", consisting of a series of performances from strip-tease dancers, burlesque singers, and the club comedians. The dance duo Slip and Slide does a soft-shoe routine. There is also a comedy sketch by Dewey "Pigmeat" Markham involving a "love-making bureau".

Cast
Vivian Harris (comedian)
Dick Barrow, Master of ceremonies
Jo Jo Adams
Mabel Hunter
Gertrude "Baby" Banks
Luella Owens
Princess D'Orsey
Gloria Howard "Atomic Bomb"
Slip and Slide
Tarza Young
The Betty Taylor Taylorettes
Olive Sayles
Maria Rout
Adella Gross
Ezella Lester
Marion L. Greene
Dorothy McCarty
Fannie Thornton
Griffen Trixie Terry
Rose Marie Foster
Gwendolyn Shaklett

References

External links
Burlesque in Harlem in the Internet Movie Database

1949 films
American black-and-white films
African-American comedy films
1949 comedy films
Films set in Harlem
1940s American films